Westside in Atlanta may mean:
 West Midtown an arts, design, and residential district on the west side of the city, or
 Historic Westside Village, a mixed-use development in Vine City, northwest Atlanta

"Westside" can also mean the entire west side of Atlanta. The name West Midtown is used by the neighbors' association in Home Park, the largest constituent neighborhood, and by the West Midtown Business Association.

"Westside" referring to West Midtown only, is used by Not for Tourists and Westside Provisions, a privately run commercial district.

Both "West Midtown" and "Westside" are used by Creative Loafing and Westside Atlanta Guide & Maps.

References

Neighborhoods in Atlanta